Across the Borderline is the 40th studio album by Willie Nelson. It was produced by Don Was, Paul Simon, and Roy Halee.  It includes songs written by Paul Simon, Ry Cooder, John Hiatt, Peter Gabriel, Bob Dylan, Lyle Lovett, and Nelson himself. Featured performers include David Crosby, Kris Kristofferson, Sinéad O'Connor, Bonnie Raitt, Bob Dylan, and Paul Simon.

The title track, "Across the Borderline", was written by Ry Cooder, John Hiatt, and Jim Dickinson. It is a remake of a song by Freddy Fender, which was featured on the motion picture soundtrack for The Border starring Jack Nicholson.

"Don't Give Up" was performed by Nelson with Sinéad O'Connor singing the part sung by Kate Bush on the original Peter Gabriel recording.

Bonnie Raitt duets with Nelson on "Getting Over You".

Nelson and Bob Dylan wrote and performed a new composition, "Heartland", for this album.

Paul Simon duets with Nelson on his composition "American Tune".

Track listing

Personnel 
 Mose Allison – piano
 Mingo Araujo – congas
 Eric Bazilian – mandolin
 Jimmy Bralower – drums
 David Campbell – harmonium
 Gene Chrisman – drums
 David Crosby – backing vocals
 Paulinho Da Costa – percussion
 Debra Dobkin – percussion 
 Bob Dylan – vocals
 Paul English – drums
 Paul Franklin – pedal steel guitar
 Johnny Gimble – violin
 Mark Goldenberg – guitar
 Milt Hinton – bass guitar
 James "Hutch" Hutchinson – bass guitar
 Mark Isham – trumpet
 Jim Keltner – drums
 Kris Kristofferson – vocals
 Mike Leech – bass guitar
 John Leventhal – guitar
 Grady Martin – guitar
 Bobbie Nelson – piano
 Mark O'Connor – violin
 Sinéad O'Connor – vocals
 Jody Payne – acoustic guitar
 Ray Phiri – guitar 
 Bonnie Raitt – vocals, slide guitar
 Mickey Raphael – harmonica
 John Selelowane – guitar 
 Paul Simon – guitar
 Smitty Smith – drums
 Bee Spears – bass guitar
 Fred Tackett – guitar 
 Benmont Tench – organ
 Danny Timms – guitar, piano, organ, backing vocals
 Robby Turner – pedal steel guitar, mandolin
 Don Was – bass guitar
 Reggie Young – guitar
 Willie Nelson – vocals, acoustic guitar

Certifications

Notes 

1993 albums
Willie Nelson albums
Albums produced by Don Was
Albums produced by Roy Halee
Columbia Records albums
Albums produced by Paul Simon